A Stevenson screen or instrument shelter is a shelter or an enclosure to  meteorological instruments against precipitation and direct heat radiation from outside sources, while still allowing air to circulate freely around them. It forms part of a standard weather station and holds instruments that may include thermometers (ordinary, maximum/minimum), a hygrometer, a psychrometer, a dewcell, a barometer, and a thermograph.

Stevenson screens may also be known as a cotton region shelter, an instrument shelter, a thermometer shelter, a thermoscreen, or a thermometer screen. Its purpose is to provide a standardised environment in which to measure temperature, humidity, dewpoint, and atmospheric pressure. It is white in color to reflect direct solar radiation.

History

It was designed by Thomas Stevenson (1818–1887), a Scottish civil engineer who designed many lighthouses, and was the father of author Robert Louis Stevenson. The development of his small thermometer screen with double-louvered walls on all sides and no floor was reported  in 1864. After comparisons with other screens in the United Kingdom, Stevenson's original design was modified.

The modifications by Edward Mawley of the Royal Meteorological Society in 1884 included a double roof, a floor with slanted boards, and a modification of the double louvers. This design was adopted by the British Meteorological Office and eventually other national services, such as Canada. The national services developed their own variations, such as the single-louvered Cotton Region design in the United States.

Composition
The traditional Stevenson screen is a box shape, constructed of wood, in a double-louvered design. However, it is possible to construct a screen using other materials and shapes, such as a pyramid.

Size

The interior size of the screen will depend on the number of instruments that are to be used. A single screen may measure  and a double screen . The unit is either supported by four metal or wooden legs or a wooden post.

The top of the screen was originally composed of two asbestos boards with an air space between them. These asbestos boards have generally been replaced by a laminate for health and safety reasons. The whole screen is painted with several coats of white to reflect sunlight radiation, and usually requires repainting every two years.

Siting
The siting of the screen is very important to avoid data degradation by the effects of ground cover, buildings and trees: WMO 2010 recommendations, if incomplete, are a sound basis.

In the northern hemisphere, the door of the screen should always face north so as to prevent direct sunlight on the thermometers. In polar regions with twenty-four-hour sunlight, the observer must take care to shield the thermometers from the sun and at the same time avoiding a rise in temperature being caused by the observer's body heat.

A special type of Stevenson screen with an eye bolt on the roof is used on a ship. The unit is hung from above and remains vertical despite the movement of the vessel.

Future
In some areas the use of single-unit automatic weather stations is supplanting the Stevenson screen and other standalone meteorological equipment.

References

External links 

 Article - Temperature measurement and the Stevenson screen
 Example of a non-traditional home built Stevenson screen

Measuring instruments
Meteorological instrumentation and equipment